Frederic is a given name. For its origin, see Frederick. Notable persons with that name include:

In arts:

 Frédéric Chopin (1810–1849), Polish composer and virtuoso pianist
 Frederic Edwin Church (1826–1900), American landscape painter
 Frederic Leighton, 1st Baron Leighton (1830–1896), English painter and sculptor
 Frederic Remington (1861–1909), American painter, illustrator, sculptor, and writer 
 Frederic Storck (1872–1942), Romanian sculptor
Frederic Matys Thursz (1930–1992), Moroccan painter, teacher
 Frederic Tuten (born 1936), American novelist, short story writer and essayist

In law:

 Frederic William Maitland (1850–1906), English jurist and historian
 Frederic Maugham, 1st Viscount Maugham (1866–1958), British lawyer and judge 

In politics:

 Frederic Bennett (1918–2002), British politician
 Frederic René Coudert, Jr. (1898–1972), American politician from New York
 Frederic M. Sackett (1868–1941), American politician and diplomat from Kentucky
 Frederic C. Walcott (1869–1949), American politician from Connecticut
Fredric Wise (1871–1928), British Conservative Party politician

In other fields:

 Frederic Charles Bartlett (1886–1969), British psychologist
 Frédéric Bourdillon (born 1991), French-Israeli basketball player in the Israel Basketball Premier League
 Frederic Lister Burk (1862–1924), Canadian-born American educator, university president, and educational theorist
 Frederic Charles Dreyer (1878–1956), officer of the Royal Navy
 Frederic Friedel (born 1945), German German chess player, publisher and businessman
 Frederic Gehring, American Catholic priest
 Frederic Hsieh (1945–1999), Chinese-American realtor and investor
Frederic B. Ingram, American businessman whose jail sentence for bribery was commuted by President Jimmy Carter and who renounced his US citizenship
 Frederic North (1866–1921), Australian civil servant and sportsman
 Frédéric Saldmann (born 1953), French cardiologist and author of books on preventive medicine
 Frederic Walker (1829–1889), English cricketer

In fictional characters:

 Frederic, the pirate apprentice of Gilbert and Sullivan's comic opera The Pirates of Penzance
 Frédéric François Chopin, protagonist in Eternal Sonata, based on the composer of the same name
 King Frederic, a recurring character from Tangled: The Series who is ruler of the island kingdom of Corona and overprotective father of Rapunzel, its long-lost princess

See also

 Federico
 Fred (disambiguation)
 Freddo
 Freddy (disambiguation)
 Frédéric
 Frederick (given name)
 Frederico
 Fredrik
 Friedrich (disambiguation)
 Fryderyk (disambiguation)

Given names

English masculine given names